Paulina Lavitz (March 29, 1879 — September 20, 1959), also seen as Pepi Lavitz, was a Polish-born actress in American Yiddish theatre.

Early life
Pilpel "Pepi" Lavitz was born in Lemberg, Galicia (now Lviv, Ukraine). Her parents were in theatre work, and her younger sister Minnie (or Minna) Birnbaum also became an actress. Lavitz started acting as a child in Europe, and trained as a singer too.

Career
Paulina Lavitz was a "leading woman" in Yiddish theatre, in Chicago and New York. In Chicago she starred at International Theater with David Silbert in Queen Sabba in 1907, and appeared with Regina Prager and Fernanda Eliscu at the Metropolitan Theatre in 1909.

She was still acting into her fifties, appearing in the melodrama Married Slaves (1935) with a Yiddish theatre co-operative in New York. There are folders related to her later career in the Records of the Hebrew Actors' Union, archived at YIVO Institute for Jewish Research.

Personal life
Pauline Lavitz married a physician and concert promoter, Dr. Max Brav. They had four children. She was widowed in 1954 and died in 1959, aged 80 years, in Flushing, New York. Her remains were buried in Mount Hebron Cemetery there.

References

External links
 

1879 births
1959 deaths
Burials at Mount Hebron Cemetery (New York City)
Actors from Lviv
American stage actresses
Polish emigrants to the United States
19th-century Polish actresses
19th-century American actresses
20th-century American actresses